Trem Desportivo Clube, commonly referred to as Trem, is a Brazilian professional club based in Macapá, Amapá founded on 1 January 1947. It competes in the Campeonato Brasileiro Série D, the fourth tier of Brazilian football, as well as in the Campeonato Amapaense, the top flight of the Amapá state football league.

As of 2022, Trem is the fourth-best ranked team from Amapá in CBF's national club ranking, being placed 228th overall.

History
On January 1, 1947, the club was founded as Trem Desportivo Clube by Bellarmino Paraense de Barros, Benedito Malcher, the brothers Osmar and Arthur Marinho, and Walter and José Banhos, among others, at one of the most important and traditional  Macapá neighborhoods.

In 1993, the club competed in the Copa do Brasil for the first time. The club was eliminated in the first stage, by Remo (first leg, at Zerão stadium, Macapá, Remo won 5–0, the second leg, at Mangueirão, Belém, Remo won again, 2–0). In 1999, due to financial difficulties, the club closed its football section. However, some years later, the club reopened it. In 2008, Trem competed again in the Copa do Brasil, but was eliminated in the first stage by Paraná.

In 2022, Trem applied one of the biggest rout in the history of the Brasileirão Série D, thrashing Náutico, of Roraima for 10 x 2, at Zerão

Colours and badge
The club's colors are red and black. The club's home kit, and its logo are heavily inspired by Flamengo ones. The home kit is composed of red and black horizontal stripes, white shorts and black socks.

The club name Trem means train in Portuguese language. It was the name of the bairro where the club was founded. The neighborhood was founded in the 19th century.

Trem's mascot is a locomotive, simply named Locomotiva. Locomotiva is also the club's nickname.

Stadium

Like other clubs in the state, Trem does not have its own stadium. Since 2017, all football matches in Amapá are held at Zerão. Up until 2014, the team also played at Glicerão, which is currently undergoing renovation.

Honours
 Torneio de Integração da Amazônia
 Winners (5): 1985, 1986, 1987, 1988, 1990

 Campeonato Amapaense
 Winners (7): 1952, 1984, 2007, 2010, 2011, 2021, 2022

Notes

References

Further reading

External links 

Trem Desportivo Clube at SoccerWay

Football clubs in Amapá
Association football clubs established in 1947
1947 establishments in Brazil
Macapá